Lipsey is a surname. Notable people with the surname include:

Alexander Lipsey, Democratic politician from the U.S. state of Michigan
Daryl Lipsey (born 1963), ice hockey player and coach
David Lipsey, Baron Lipsey (born 1948), British Labour Party politician
Matt Lipsey, British television and film director
Richard Lipsey (born 1928), Canadian academic and economist
Stanford Lipsey (1927–2016), American newspaper publisher
Joshua Lipsey (born 1983), Canadian fitness coach and entrepreneur

See also 
Lipsey, Illinois, United States, an unincorporated community